The 2010 Champions Tour was the 31st season for the golf tour now known as PGA Tour Champions since it officially began in 1980 as the Senior PGA Tour. The season consisted of 26 official money events with purses totalling $51,475,000, including five majors. Bernhard Langer topped the end-of-season money list for an unprecedented third consecutive year, winning $2,648,939, and also won the most tournaments, five. Fred Couples had a spectacularly successful rookie season. He finished second in the first tournament he entered, followed by wins in his next three events. Couples finished the season with four wins, was second to Langer on the money list, and set a tour record for lowest scoring average (67.96).  The tournament results, leaders, and award winners are listed below.

Tournament results
The following table shows all the official money events for the 2010 season. "Date" is the ending date of the tournament. The numbers in parentheses after the winners' names are the number of wins they had on the tour up to and including that event. Senior majors are shown in bold. No golfer won on his Champions Tour debut this season.

Leaders
Scoring Average leaders

Source:

Money List leaders

Source:

Career Money List leaders

Source:

Awards

See also
Champions Tour awards
Champions Tour records

References

External links
PGA Tour Champions official site

PGA Tour Champions seasons
Champions Tour